Georges Duval de Leyrit (7 August 1716 – 9 April 1764) was Governor General of Pondicherry between 1755 and 1758. He was preceded by Charles Godeheu and succeeded by as Arthur, comte de Lally-Tollendal.

Titles

French colonial governors and administrators
Governors of French India
1716 births
1764 deaths